Retrospective III: 1989–2008 is a compilation album by Canadian rock band Rush released on March 3, 2009. The album is a collection of songs from the third and fourth decades of the band (1989–2008), which they spent signed to Atlantic Records. The album is available in two versions. The 2-disc version includes a DVD of music and live videos.

Album artwork
Retrospective III: 1989–2008 displays the covers of six albums – Vapor Trails, Test for Echo, Counterparts, Roll the Bones, Presto, and alternate artwork for Snakes & Arrows – on the wall, while that of the Feedback EP rests on the floor. The Snakes & Arrows art, designed by Hugh Syme, was originally used on that album's insert and later appeared on the cover of the Snakes & Arrows Live album; the portion featuring the battered road sign was used for the DVD version. The dog from the cover of Signals sits looking up at the covers, and the pushbroom used by the janitor on the covers of the Retrospective I, Retrospective II, and Gold compilations rests against the wall. The dog appears on the Gold cover as well, but is not present on the other two Retrospective album covers.

Content
This is the only Retrospective collection to feature live material, in the form of the song "Ghost of a Chance (Live version)". This version is notable for not being previously available on any other Rush release. Retrospective III also features remixes of the two tracks from Vapor Trails, which were done to correct mastering problems associated with the album.

Track listing

Disc 1 (CD)

Disc 2 (DVD)
(directors in parentheses)
 "Stick It Out" (Samuel Bayer) from Counterparts
 "Nobody's Hero" (Dale Heslip)
 "Half the World" (Dale Heslip) from Test for Echo
 "Driven" (Dale Heslip)
 "Roll the Bones" (Chris Painter)
 "Show Don't Tell" (Doug Freel) from Presto
 "The Pass" (Matt Mahurin)
 "Superconductor" (Gerald Casale) from Presto
 "Far Cry" (Christopher Mills)
 "Malignant Narcissism" (Bobby Standridge)
 "The Seeker" (live) (Pierre Lamoureux) originally from Feedback (2004)
 "Secret Touch" (live) (Pierre Lamoureux) originally from Vapor Trails
 "Resist" (live) (Pierre Lamoureux) originally from Test for Echo
Bonus material: interview and "Tom Sawyer" (live) (Jim Hoskinson)

Song origins
 Tracks 6, 7, 8 from Presto (1989).
 Track 5 from Roll the Bones (1991).
 Tracks 1 and 2 from Counterparts (1993).
 Tracks 3 and 4 from Test for Echo (1996).
 Tracks 11 and 13 originally from R30 (2005).
 Track 12 previously unreleased, originally from Vapor Trails (2002). Recorded on the R30 tour at the Festhalle Frankfurt (September 24, 2004).
 Tracks 9 and 10 from Snakes & Arrows (2007).
 Bonus track from The Colbert Report (episode dated July 16, 2008).

Personnel
Geddy Lee    – bass guitars, synthesizers, vocals
Alex Lifeson – electric and acoustic guitars, synthesizers
Neil Peart   – drums, percussion, electronic percussion, lyricist

See also 
 Retrospective I
 Retrospective II
 Gold

References

2009 compilation albums
Anthem Records compilation albums
Rush (band) compilation albums
Atlantic Records compilation albums